Phinaea ecuadorana is a species of plant in the family Gesneriaceae. It is endemic to Ecuador.  Its natural habitat is subtropical or tropical moist montane forests.

The species is now considered a synonym of Amalophyllon divaricatum, a relatively common species found in southern Ecuador and northern Peru.

References

Gesnerioideae
Endemic flora of Ecuador
Vulnerable plants
Taxonomy articles created by Polbot